Black Butte Lake is an artificial lake located in Tehama and Glenn counties in the U.S. state of California. The lake was formed from Stony Creek in 1963 upon the completion of Black Butte Dam by the U.S. Army Corps of Engineers. The dam and lake were constructed for flood protection for local towns and agricultural lands.

The California Office of Environmental Health Hazard Assessment released a warning regarding eating fish caught from this lake based on the elevated mercury level.

See also
List of dams and reservoirs in California
List of lakes in California
Orland Buttes

References

External links
Black Butte Lake

Reservoirs in Glenn County, California
Reservoirs in Tehama County, California
Reservoirs in California
Reservoirs in Northern California